Eggs per gram (eggs/g) is a laboratory test that determines the number of eggs per gram of feces in patients suspected of having a parasitological infection, such as schistosomiasis.

Measuring the number of eggs per gram is the primary diagnostic method for schistosomiasis, as opposed to a blood test. Eggs per gram or another analyse like larvae per gram of faeces is one of the most important experiments that is done in parasitology labs.

Methods to count the number of eggs per gram:
 Willis method
 McMaster method
 Clayton-Lane method

See also
 Kato technique
 Helminths

References

External links 
 

Parasitology
Clinical pathology